Dibrachicystis is an extinct genus of rhombiferan echinoderm from the early Middle Cambrian (Miaolingian, Wuliuan, about 510 Ma). It is a stalked echinoderm within the family Dibrachicystidae which lived in what is now northernmost Iberian Chains, northern Spain. It is known from the holotype MPZ2009/1230 and from the paratypes MPZ2011/2–6. It was found in the uppermost part of the Murero Formation at Purujosa, Moncayo Natural Park, dating to the Lower Languedocian and referred to the Solenopleuropsis thorali Zone. It was first named by Samuel Zamora and A. B. Smith in 2011 and the type species is Dibrachicystis purujoensis.

Phylogeny
Cladogram after Zamora & Smith, 2011:

References

Rhombifera
Cambrian echinoderms
Extinct animals of Europe
Fossil taxa described in 2011